HMS Fearless (L10) was a Royal Navy amphibious assault ship that served from 1965 until 2002. One of two s, she was based in HMNB Portsmouth and saw service around the world over her 37-year life. She was the last steam-powered surface ship in the Royal Navy.

Role

The landing platform docks (LPD) supported a Royal Marines amphibious assault force and provided a platform for the Headquarters capability prior to, and during, the assault phase. The Royal Marines served aboard as the 4th Assault Squadron. The Squadron included crew for the four LCUs, four LCVPs and the Beach Party, which was equipped with a Land Rover, a Bedford 4-ton truck, two tractor units—one a track layer, the other equipped with a bucket—and a Centurion BARV. The squadron also had duties aboard, (ensuring equipment and troops got to shore as they were needed), radio operators and administration.

Service
Fearless was the first purpose-built LPD used by the Royal Navy. Built in Belfast at the Harland and Wolff yard, she was launched in 1963 before undergoing trials and commissioning in 1965.

Following commissioning, her first operational tasking was acting as a command platform for British Counter-Terrorism operations in Aden, operating Royal Air Force aircraft and the Irish Guards prior to the British withdrawal as Flag of a 25 platform task group. Following the Aden experiences, she was the venue for talks between Harold Wilson and Ian Smith in 1968, over the future of Rhodesia. The latter had unilaterally declared independence(UDI) from Britain, owing to Britain's insistence on the removal of white minority rule.

Between 1969 and 1970 she was commanded by Captain John Gerard-Pearse. During this time, Fearless toured the Far East and was involved in emergency assistance work in Bangladesh after Typhoon Bhola, carrying 59 Royal Engineers Squadron, who would later become 59 Independent Commando Squadron.

In July 1972, Fearless ferried several Centurion AVRE demolition vehicles, derived from the Centurion tank, to Northern Ireland to be deployed there as part of Operation Motorman.

Fearless featured in the 1977 James Bond film The Spy Who Loved Me as the ship that picks up Bond's escape pod. The filming took place the previous year near the island of Malta.

Fearless was part of the British naval force committed to Operation Corporate, the 1982 Falklands War. Fitted with modern satellite communications equipment, it hosted the staff of amphibious force commander Commodore Michael Clapp (Commodore Amphibious Warfare (COMAW)), and Commanding Officer 3 Commando Brigade, Brigadier Julian Thompson and his staff, as well as elements of the landing force. During the conflict, two of the ship's landing craft were involved in rescuing crew from  after it had been bombed.  Royal Marine Coxswain Corporal Alan White received a commendation from the Task Force Commander, Admiral Sir John Fieldhouse, for his part in rescuing 41 crew using Foxtrot 7, one of four LCVP landing craft carried by Fearless. Colour-Sergeant Brian Johnston was awarded the Queen's Gallantry Medal for rescuing other crew members in Foxtrot 4, a larger LCU landing craft; he and five of F4's crew were killed, and two injured, on 8 June 1982 in an attack by enemy aircraft.  Foxtrot 7 is now located in the Royal Marines Museum in Portsmouth, with detailed accounts from Corporal White of the missions he took part in, including the landings at San Carlos.  F4 was replaced but is now named FJ in memory of C-Sgt Johnston.

She was placed out of commission for three years in 1985 prior to a two-year refit at Devonport, recommissioning in 1991. During this refit, her 1940s-vintage 40mm Bofors cannon and 1960s-vintage Sea Cat anti-aircraft missile launchers were replaced by 20 mm BMARC and Phalanx CIWS guns.

From 1991 until 1995 she supported the sea training phase of initial officer training, undertaken at Britannia Royal Naval College, as part of the Dartmouth Training Squadron.

Her last major duty was to take part in amphibious exercises shortly before decommissioning.

Decommissioned

Fearless was decommissioned in 2002 and awaited disposal in Fareham Creek, Hampshire, moored alongside her sister ship . In October 2007, it was reported that Fearless was to be scrapped in Belgium,
five years after the vessel was officially mothballed in Portsmouth. On 17 December 2007, Fearless was towed to Ghent in Belgium to be broken. This was the first warship successfully exported for recycling by any western government that fully complied with international agreements and the principles concerning environmentally sound management of waste.

They were commissioned in 2003 and 2005 respectively.

References

External links

HMS Fearless Association
Pictures of HMS Fearless being broken up
HMS Fearless Book 1970–1972
HMS Fearless Operational and manning arrangements

 

Fearless-class landing platform docks
Cold War amphibious warfare vessels of the United Kingdom
Ships built in Belfast
Falklands War naval ships of the United Kingdom
1963 ships
Ships built by Harland and Wolff

it:HMS Fearless